The ChromeOS core fonts, also known as the Croscore fonts, are a collection of three TrueType font families: Arimo (sans-serif), Tinos (serif) and Cousine (monospace). These fonts are metrically compatible with Monotype Corporation’s Arial, Times New Roman, and Courier New, the most commonly used fonts on Microsoft Windows, for which they are intended as open-source substitutes.

Google licenses these fonts from Ascender Corporation under the Apache License 2.0.

The fonts were originally developed by Steve Matteson as Ascender Sans and Ascender Serif, and were also the basis for the Liberation fonts licensed by Red Hat under another open source license. In July 2012, version 2.0 of the Liberation fonts, based on the Croscore fonts, was released under the SIL Open Font License.

The fonts are also available at the Noto fonts repository at GitHub.

Crosextra fonts

In 2013, Google released an additional Crosextra (ChromeOS Extra) package, featuring Carlito (which matches Microsoft's Calibri) and Caladea (matching Cambria). These two fonts are respectively metric-adjusted versions of Lato and Cambo, both available at Google Fonts.

See also
 Droid, a font family by the same font designer
 Liberation fonts, related metric-compatible font families also made by Ascender Corporation

References

External links 
 Carlito in GitHub
 Carlito in FontLibrary

Unified serif and sans-serif typeface families
Unicode typefaces
Free software
Open-source typefaces
IPA typefaces